The 2020–21 Botola Pro, also known as Botola Pro Inwi for sponsorship reasons, is the 64th season of the Premier League and the 10th under its new format of Moroccan Pro League, the top Moroccan professional league for association football clubs, since its establishment in 1956.

Raja Casablanca came into the season as defending champions of the 2019–20 season. Chabab Mohammédia and Maghreb de Fès entered as the two promoted teams from the 2019–20 Botola 2.

The season began on 4 December 2020 and ended on 28 July 2021.

Wydad AC are crowned champions of this edition three rounds before the end of the tournament with a record of 21 Botola.

Teams

Stadium and locations

Number of teams by regions

Personnel and kits 

1. On the back of shirt.
2. On the sleeves.
3. On the shorts.  
Additionally, referee kits are made by Puma.

Managerial changes

Foreign players 
All teams are allowed to register up to five foreign players, but can only use up to three players on the field at the same time.

League table

Results

Positions by round
The table lists the positions of teams after each week of matches.

Season statistics

Top goalscorers

Top assists

Hat-tricks

(H) – Home ; (A) – Away
4 – Player scored four goals.

Clean Sheets

Scoring
First goal of the season:  Salaheddine Icharane for Chabab Mohammédia against Moghreb Tétouan (4 December 2020)
Last goal of the season:  Ayoub Mallouki for Hassania Agadir against Difaâ El Jadidi (28 July 2021)

Discipline

Player 
 Most yellow cards: 10
  Ayoub Qasmi (MC Oujda)
 Most red cards: 2
  El Mehdi Karnass (DH Jadida)
  Larbi Naji (RS Berkane)
  Yassine Rami (HUS Agadir)
  Hicham Taik (CAY Berrechid)
  Hamza Semmoumy (MC Oujda)
  Issoufou Dayo (RS Berkane)
  Salaheddine Bahi (MC Oujda)
  Karim El Bounagate (OC Safi)
  Anas El Asbahi (IR Tanger)
  Abdelkhalek Hamidouch (RCA Zemamra)
  Ayoub Gaadaoui (OC Safi)

Club 
 Most yellow cards: 74
 MC Oujda
 Most red cards: 9
 RS Berkane
 Fewest yellow cards: 42
 Raja CA
 Fewest red cards: 1
 AS FAR

See also
2019–20 Moroccan Throne Cup
2020–21 Botola 2
2020–21 Moroccan Amateur National Championship
2020–21 CAF Champions League
2020–21 CAF Confederation Cup
2020–21 Moroccan Women's Championship Division One
2020–21 Moroccan Women's Championship Division Two
2019–20 Moroccan Women's Throne Cup

References

External links 
frmf.ma

Morocco
Botola seasons
Botola